The Giza Zoo is a zoological garden in Giza, Egypt. It is one of the few green areas in the city, and includes Giza's largest park.

The first to be built in the Middle East, rare species have been successfully bred in the zoo—including the first California sea lion to be born in the region.

History
The zoo was built by Khedive Ismail and opened on 1 March 1891. It was built on about 50 feddan that was once part of the harem gardens. Ismail imported many plants from India, Africa, and South America, of which a banyan tree planted about 1871 can still be seen. The original 180 birds and 78 other animals in the zoo's collection were taken from Ismail's private menagerie.

In the late 1870s, the state took over the zoo as partial payment of the Ismail's debts. In January 1890, the harem building was opened as a natural history museum, and was used in this manner until a new museum was opened in Tahrir Square in 1902. The portion of the gardens facing the Nile were sold to the public for large homes, but the harem gardens were kept intact.

When the zoo was built, the exhibits with semi-natural habitats were considered spacious by European standards. The animal collection emphasized Egyptian species, and at one time claimed 20,000 individuals representing 400 species, though many of these may have been migratory birds.

Around 1900, Captain Stanley Smyth Flower was appointed director of the Gardens. He would remain in that position until his retirement in 1923. From 1906 to 1923, Michael John Nicoll was his assistant. For a short time he was director, but the next year he had to retire. J. Lewis Bonhote worked at the Gardens from 1913 to 1919.

By the mid-twentieth century, the zoo was considered one of the best zoos in the world, but it has had trouble adapting to the pressures of growth in the latter half of the century as human populations in Cairo have increased.

By the end of World War II the zoo claimed 4,700 exhibits, with a total of 700 mammals and 500 reptiles. Attendance levels of 43,567 in 1889 rose to 223,525 by 1906. In 2007, the zoo hosted almost 3.4 million visitors.

In 2004, the zoo lost its membership with the World Association of Zoos and Aquariums (WAZA), because it did not pay membership fees, and then ignored the recommendations of WAZA inspectors. As of 2010, it is a member of the African Association of Zoos and Aquaria (PAAZAB), and is working towards getting re-accredited by WAZA.

Animals

Mammals at the zoo include giraffes, rhinos, black bears, raccoons, elephants, sea lions, tigers, lions, cheetahs, zebras, agoutis, red foxs, Dorcas gazelles, and Scimitar horned oryxes.

The zoo has lot of different species of birds like flamingos, falcons, peacocks, vultures, ibis, love birds, and macaws.

The zoo has many species of reptiles that belong to Egypt like the Egyptian cobra and tortoise. It also has Nile crocodiles and American alligators.

Facilities
The gardens include roads paved with black stone flags from Trieste, footpaths decorated with pebbles laid out like mosaics, and a pond with a marble island that is now the zoo's Tea Island.

The zoo also includes a suspension bridge designed by Gustave Eiffel that lets visitors view the animals from above. This bridge may have been the first elevated viewing area at any zoo in the world.

There is a reptile house and taxidermist's building on site.

The future
As part of the upgrades to help the zoo recover its membership in WAZA, in 2008 the bear exhibit was outfitted with fans and misters to help cool the bears. There are plans to run chilled water through the floors to make the bears more comfortable.

In December 2022, government announced the zoo will be closed for a year for renovating

See also

 Alexandria Zoo

Notes

External links

 
 Film of the Giza zoo from the 1920s

Buildings and structures in Cairo
Zoos established in 1891
Zoos in Egypt